Phosphonoacetaldehyde reductase (NADH) (PhpC) is an enzyme with systematic name 2-hydroxyethylphosphonate:NAD+ oxidoreductase. This enzyme catalyses the following chemical reaction

 2-hydroxyethylphosphonate + NAD+  phosphonoacetaldehyde + NADH + H+

The enzyme from Streptomyces viridochromogenes catalyses a step in the biosynthesis of phosphinothricin tripeptide, the reduction of phosphonoacetaldehyde to 2-hydroxyethylphosphonate.

References

External links 
 

EC 1.1.1